Pāvels Surņins (born 4 August 1985 in Liepāja, Latvia) is a Latvian former professional football midfielder, who spent all his career with FK Liepājas Metalurgs in the Latvian Higher League.

Club career
Surņins played for FK Liepājas Metalurgs-2 in 2005 in the 1.līga, the second tier in Latvian football, scoring five goals, as well as making seven appearances for FK Liepājas Metalurgs in the Virslīga.

In the 2006 season he played 28 games for Liepājas Metalurgs in the Virslīga as well as one game in the Latvian Cup, the semi-final match against FC Skonto which they won 2–1. He made two substitute appearances in both legs of the 2007 Baltic League Final.

Surņins retired from professional football before the start of 2013 due to long-term injury problems. In March 2016 he signed for Hyde United.

International career
Surņins played for the Latvian Under-21s. In September 2006 he was called into the Latvian squad for the UEFA Euro 2008 qualifiers against Iceland and Northern Ireland by national coach, Jurijs Andrejevs. He made his international debut in 2007.

Honours
Club
 Virsliga runner-up: (2) 2006, 2007
 Latvian Cup winner (1) 2006
 Baltic League winner: (1) 2007

References

External links

1985 births
Living people
Sportspeople from Liepāja
Latvian footballers
FK Liepājas Metalurgs players
Latvia international footballers
Association football midfielders